Augne is a commune in the Haute-Vienne department in the Nouvelle-Aquitaine region in central-western France.

See also
Communes of the Haute-Vienne department

References

Communes of Haute-Vienne